The OMNI Center for Peace, Justice and Ecology is a multipurpose organization active mostly in Arkansas and its surrounding states in the United States. It was founded by retired University of Arkansas English professor James R. Bennett in 2001. Besides organizing peace demonstrations and forums on issues like climate change in the Fayetteville, Arkansas area, it sponsors awards programs that have recognized literary and peace work on local, national and international issues.

Formation 
As an English professor at the University of Arkansas from 1965 to 1997, Bennett incorporated peace issues into his courses. While teaching, he joined the local Peace Organization Committee, a group that protested the Vietnam War, and continued engaging in such activities throughout his career. When he retired, he founded the OMNI Center with help from friends, including Dana Copp.

The first office was in the basement of the Presbyterian Church’s university campus ministry. They liked the "OMNI" name since it signified being inclusive of all people and issues. They originally called the organization the "OMNI Center for Peace and Justice" but later added "Ecology" to appeal to environmental groups like the Sierra Club.

Activities expand as OMNI grows 
The organization grew following the September 11, 2001, terrorist attacks and invasions of Afghanistan and Iraq. Besides organizing large protests, members developed educational activities. An open mic event and a commemoration for the bombings of Hiroshima and Nagasaki began in 2001. The commemoration became an annual event to honor the dead from all wars, while open mics also became regular occurrences.

OMNI hired a paid executive director starting in 2012. Gladys Tiffany became the director in 2013 and spearheaded new programs, including a low-power radio station run by volunteers, activist training workshops, women’s support groups, and movie screenings. The group collaborated with other community organizations to stage events such as a Civil Rights Roundtable and lent financial support to other projects. 

In 2019, OMNI began a new student activism support group at the University of Arkansas to mentor students. In January 2020, about 100 people attended a demonstration organized by OMNI and the Arkansas Nonviolence Alliance in Fayetteville to protest a potential war with Iran.

International PeaceWriting Award 
Bennett established the International PeaceWriting Award program in 1999 to recognize fiction and nonfiction book-length works that focus on the causes, consequences, and remedies of wars, as well as those covering nonviolent peacemaking and peacemakers. After forming OMNI two years later, that center became one of the sponsoring organizations of those awards, along with the Peace and Justice Studies Association of Georgetown University. 

Honorees of the program, who received a cash prize along with recognition, include:

 Playwright Catherine Filloux, Lemkin’s House, 2006 
 Ground Zero Minnesota founder and professor Michael Murphy Andregg, On the Causes of War, 1999
 John Carroll University professor Philip Metres, Behind the Lines: War Resistance Poetry in the United States, 1940-2000, 2002
 Nuclear Age Peace Foundation founder David Krieger, Today Is Not a Good Day for War, 2005, other poetry collections in 2007 and 2010
 Retired English professor Alexander Blackburn, The Physicist, 2003
 Pax Educare founder Mary Lee Morrison, The Life of Elise Boulding, 2002
 Journalist Kevin James Shay, Walking through the Wall, 2002
 Business consultant Ken Beller, Great Peacemakers: True Stories from Around the World, 2007 
 Playwright Molly Hersage, The Perfect Endgame, 2006 
 Playwright Anita Yellin Simons, Ladies First, 2006 
 Novelist Mark C. Hungerford, The Quiet Bower, 2004 
 Playwright Monica Raymond, The Owl Girl, 2008  
 Children’s author Jan Sherbin, Under Fire, 2005
 Polish teacher Stanley Opalka, Escape from Russia, 2005 
 Novelist Kathleen Kern, Where Such Unmaking Reigns, 2003

Arkansas Peace and Justice Heroes Award 
In 2004, OMNI and the American Friends Service Committee started the Arkansas Peace and Justice Heroes Award program to recognize advocates throughout the state. Honorees who have been recognized at a formal banquet include: 

 Writer and artist Diana Rivers, 2005
 History professor and genocide expert Samuel Totten, 2007
 Jonesboro youth program leader Rennell Woods, 2007 
 Citizens First Congress director Bill Kopsky, 2007
 Community activist Eleanor Johnson, 2007
 Bridge of Peace co-founder Hamsa Newmark, 2008
 Attorney Michael R. McCray, 2008
 Habitat for Humanity director Patsy Brewer, 2008
 Community advocate Vickie Tidwell, 2008
 Jacob David George, Afghanistan war veteran who raised awareness for peace through music and a cross-country bicycle riding group, 2011

References

External links 
 OMNI Center for Peace, Justice and Ecology
 James R. "Dick" Bennett’s Peace, Justice and Ecology newsletters

Non-profit organizations based in the United States
Organizations established in 2001
Progressive organizations in the United States
Peace organizations based in the United States